Bertie Donnelly (1894 – 16 November 1977) was an Irish cyclist. He competed in the sprint and the time trial events at the 1928 Summer Olympics. In his life outside cycling, he was a grocer, wine, and spirits merchant.

References

External links
 

1894 births
1977 deaths
Irish male cyclists
Olympic cyclists of Ireland
Cyclists at the 1928 Summer Olympics